Rumstick may refer to:

 Ezra Rumstick
 Rumstick (card game), English name for the game of Romestecq